This is a list of artists and producers who were signed to the now-defunct No Limit Records.

#
504 Boyz
6 Piece

B
Big Ed the Assassin (deceased)

C
C-Murder (incarcerated) 
Choppa
Curren$y

E
E-A-Ski

F
Fiend
Full Blooded

G
Gambino Family
Ghetto Commission

K
Kane & Abel
Krazy

L
Lil Italy
Lil Ric
Lil Soldiers

M
Mac
Magic (deceased)
Master P
Mercedes
Mia X
Mo B. Dick
Mr. Marcelo
Mr. Serv-On
Mystikal

P
Prime Suspects

R
Romeo Miller
Rich Boyz

S
Sera Lynn
Silkk the Shocker
Skull Duggery (deceased) 
Snoop Dogg
Sons of Funk
Sonya C
Soulja Slim (deceased)
Steady Mobb'n

T
TRU

Y
Young Bleed

Producers 
Beats By the Pound
Donald XL Robertson
KLC
Mo B. Dick
Odell

No Limit Records